The 2016 Grand Prix Cycliste de Québec is the 7th edition of the Grand Prix Cycliste de Québec road bicycle race. The race took place on 9 September 2016, and was won by Peter Sagan in the sprint before Greg Van Avermaet and Anthony Roux.

Teams 
The 18 UCI World Tour teams are automatically entitled and obliged to start the race. The race organisation gave out two wildcards to UCI Professional Continental teams.

Results

References 

Grand Prix Cycliste de Québec
2016 UCI World Tour
2016 in Canadian sports
2016 in Quebec
September 2016 sports events in Canada